The Racah Lecture is annual memorial lecture given at The Racah Institute of Physics of the Hebrew University of Jerusalem commemorating Prof. Giulio Racah.
The lecturers are selected from among the leading physists in the world.

List of Previous Years Speakers

References 

Lists of physicists
Hebrew University of Jerusalem
Lectures
Recurring events established in 1971
Israel-related lists